Sabine Rumpf (born 18 March 1983 in Wiesbaden) is a German discus thrower.

Achievements

References

External links
 

1983 births
Living people
Sportspeople from Wiesbaden
German female discus throwers
German national athletics champions
Competitors at the 2005 Summer Universiade
Competitors at the 2009 Summer Universiade
20th-century German women
21st-century German women